Cychrus davidis is a species of ground beetle in the subfamily of Carabinae. It was described by Fairmaire in 1886.

References

davidis
Beetles described in 1886